No Byung-jun (Hanja: 盧炳俊; born 29 September 1979) is a former South Korean footballer who played as a striker or a winger. He was voted MVP of the 2009 AFC Champions League after scoring the decisive free kick for Pohang Steelers in the final against Al-Ittihad.

Career statistics

Club

International

Honours
Pohang Steelers
K League 1: 2013
Korean FA Cup: 2008, 2012, 2013

Korean League Cup: 2009
AFC Champions League: 2009

South Korea U20
AFC Youth Championship: 1998

South Korea B
Summer Universiade bronze medal: 2001

South Korea
EAFF Championship runner-up: 2010

Individual
AFC Champions League Most Valuable Player: 2009

References

External links

1979 births
Living people
Association football forwards
South Korean footballers
South Korea under-20 international footballers
South Korea international footballers
Jeonnam Dragons players
Grazer AK players
Pohang Steelers players
Ulsan Hyundai FC players
Daegu FC players
Expatriate footballers in Austria
South Korean expatriate footballers
South Korean expatriate sportspeople in Austria
K League 1 players
K League 2 players
Austrian Football Bundesliga players
Sportspeople from Ulsan
South Korean Buddhists